Carposina chaetolopha is a moth in the Carposinidae family. It was described by Alfred Jefferis Turner in 1926. It is found in Australia.

References

Natural History Museum Lepidoptera generic names catalog

Carposinidae
Moths described in 1926
Moths of Australia